Johan Erikson (born 20 January 1985) is a Swedish ski jumper who represents Holmens IF. He had his best season in 2003/2004, when he finished the season with many top-20 finishes, including a 16th at Liberec in 2004.

Erikson has a characteristic style whereby he travels very quickly, but does not fly especially far. However, he is the Swede with the second-furthest distance of all time, with his 201 metres at Planica in 2007, after Isak Grimholm.

References
https://web.archive.org/web/20090120141736/http://www.fis-ski.com/de/606/615.html?sector=JP&competitorid=70448&type=result

Swedish male ski jumpers
Living people
1985 births